Aposphaerion is a genus of beetles in the family Cerambycidae, containing the following species:

 Aposphaerion fasciatum (Martins, 1971)
 Aposphaerion longicolle Bates, 1870
 Aposphaerion nigritum Galileo & Martins, 2010
 Aposphaerion punctulatum Martins & Napp, 1992
 Aposphaerion unicolor (White, 1855)

References

Elaphidiini